Ramjas College  is a college of the University of Delhi located in North Campus of the university in New Delhi, India.The college admits both undergraduates and post-graduates, and awards degrees under the purview of the University of Delhi. Ramjas College is considered as one of the best colleges in India.

It is one of the founding colleges of University of Delhi, along with Hindu College and St. Stephen's College. It is a co-educational college that admits students and select teachers from all communities irrespective of gender, caste, religion and physical challenges. The college is situated in the north campus of university of Delhi.

History 
Founded on 17January 1917 by the great educationist and philanthropist, Rai Kedar Nath, Ramjas College is the oldest college of Delhi University after Hindu College and St. Stephen's College. Initially it was affiliated with university of Punjab, Lahore up to intermediate level. Beginning from the humble precincts of Darya Ganj in Old Delhi. The college was named in memory of Lala Ramjas, father of Rai Kedar Nath, the founder of the college. In its starting days, the college was run by the Ramjas Foundation - an educational foundation that runs schools and educational institutions in Delhi. When University of Delhi was formed in 1922, it was upgraded to degree level and brought under the University. Ramjas College has since been a humble part of that University. After formation of DU, the college was brought under government control but Ramjas Foundation kept looking over the administrative works of the college.
In 1924, Its other branch named Ramjas intermediate college was opened at Daryaganj and old college was moved to a new campus at Anand Parbat (which was then called Kala Pahad) near the serai Rohilla Station about two miles from heart of city. The college was then inaugurated at its new location by Mahatma Gandhi, who was also a good friend of Rai Kedar Nath. But during World War II, the college had to cede its campus at Anand Parbat to the British Wireless Experimental Centre. In the same period, at time of Quit India Movement, a group of Ramjas students went ahead and joined the freedom struggle which resulted in them being arrested and jailed. A plaque with their names inscribed on it has been put up near the college auditorium gate in memory of the brave students.

The college relocated to its current location in 1950. Dr Rajendra Prasad, the first President of India inaugurated the present building on January 17, 1951. He even sent his daughters to study here. After the death of Rai Kedarnath, Dr. B. R. Ambedkar, the architect of Constitution of India and first Minister of Law and Justice of India, acted as the Chairman of Governing Body of Ramjas College, the only College in Delhi that had the honour of having him in its Governing Body. On 12 February 1959, The famous black American leader Martin Luther King Jr. visited the college and made a memorable speech to the students. Now almost equal in number, there were only two females out of 161 students in 1942–43 session.

In January 2004, the College organised the first-ever Conference of Graduate Students of Economics from the SAARC countries.

Ramjas was celebrating its Centennial legacy from 2016 and completed its 100 years celebration in January 2017. In 2017 India Post issued a postage stamp to commemorate the Centenary Year of Ramjas college Delhi.

Academics

Academic programmes 
The college offers 8 Bachelor of Arts courses, 8 Bachelor of Science courses and 2 Bachelor of Commerce courses at undergraduate level. Primary medium of instruction of courses is English. Further, it offers 18 postgraduate courses in sciences, humanities and commerce streams. Additionally, there are 26 add-on courses and 6 foreign language courses on offer.

Rankings
In 2021, India Today ranked Ramjas College 7th among commerce colleges, 10th among arts colleges and 17th among science colleges in India.

Campus 
The college's red coloured building is surrounded by trees and foliage which has earned it the title 'Rainforest'. A Seminar Room and a Conference Hall form the nucleus of all the academic conferences, events and proceedings of the college.
It has volleyball, basketball, football and table tennis facilities. It also has its own shooting range and an archery range within the campus. It also has a gymnasium with modern equipment.

Hostel 
The college also provides hostel facility with 80 seats for girls and 120 seats for boys which is in the college campus.

Student societies 
The college is also known for its students' involvement in student politics. The DUSU (Delhi University Students' Union) has been known to have major contributions from Ramjas College, the most important being the victory of alumnus Akshit Dahiya as the DUSU President (2019–20) with a margin of 19,069 votes and him also being the youngest DUSU President in a very long time, aged 20 when elected.

The Ramjas Debating Society is one of the best debating society in India having made some of the best contributions to the Indian Debating Circuit.Members of the Society have qualified at multiple International tournaments such as Oxford, Harvard , LSE and WUDC. 

The college offers a wide range of courses, extra-curricular activities and technologically advanced facilities accessible to the faculty, the students and the support staff. There are specific zones formed by the authorities of Ramjas College to emphasize on various aspects. The woman development cell, student information and management system support services, clubs, gender forum, student counsellor, student activity centre and various societies of Ramjas College encourage students to participate in different areas other than academics.

Notable alumni 
The alumni of Ramjas College are called Ramjasites. Notable alumni include:

 Ajit Prakash Shah, Chief Justice of Delhi High Court
 Sumit Antil, Gold medalist, Javelin Throw, Tokyo 2020 Paralympic Games
 Angaraag Mahanta, composer and singer
 Partha Dasgupta, an Indian-British economist
 Vivekanand Sinha, IPS and Inspector General of Police of Bastar.
 Ch. Sarup Singh ,  a former minister of Excise and Taxation, Development and Cooperation, Haryana; and a former Speaker of Haryana
 Chaudhary Brahm Prakash, 1st Chief Minister of Delhi
 Kahlil Joseph, American Actor
 Manish Jha, Film director
 Manoj Bajpai, Actor
 Nivedita Tiwari, TV Actress
 Pathik Vats, Dialogue writer & lyricist
Prakash Jha, Film Director
 Pratap Keshari Deb, Member of Rajya Sabha
 Praveen Kumar, Indian cricketer
 Pravesh Rana, Bigg Boss finalist and Model
 Rahul Roy, Actor & Documentary filmmaker
 Raj Kumar Gupta, Film director
Sanjay Kumar, Director CSDS
 Ranbir Singh Hooda, Activist
 Sarup Singh, Governor of Gujarat and Governor of Kerala
 Shekhar Suman, Actor & Presenter
Somnath Bharti, former Minister of Law and Justice of Delhi
 Vikas Bahl, Film director & producer
Vijender Gupta, Leader of Opposition, Delhi
Yogesh Kumar Sabharwal, 36th Chief Justice of India
Vipin Patwa, Music composer & singer
Bhaskar Jyoti Mahanta, IPS Officer,  DGP of Assam
Shivam Pradhan, Actor
 Sumit Antil,Paralympic Gold Medalist & World record Javelin Champion

References

External links 
 

Delhi University
Universities and colleges in Delhi
Educational institutions established in 1917
Commerce colleges in India
1917 establishments in India